Deulabari Union is a union of Ghatail Upazila, Tangail District, Bangladesh. It is situated 10 km north of Ghatail and 44 km north of Tangail, The District Headquarter.

Demographics

According to Population Census 2011 performed by Bangladesh Bureau of Statistics, The total population of Deulabari union is 34983. There are  households 8869 in total.

Education

The literacy rate of Deulabari Union is 46.6% (Male-48.8%, Female-44.5%). Notable educational includes Pakutia Public School and College.

See also
 Union Councils of Tangail District

References

Populated places in Dhaka Division
Populated places in Tangail District
Unions of Ghatail Upazila